Eric Tagg (born January 9, 1953) is an American singer, songwriter and musician. He was previously a member of Dutch music groups Beehive and Rainbow Train. He is also notable for being the songwriter, bassist and vocalist in guitarist Lee Ritenour’s band. He is the younger brother of musician Larry Tagg.

Discography

Studio albums

Singles
1975 - "A Fantasy"
1977 - "Fancy Meeting You"
1982 - "Keep It Alive" / "Tied Up"
1981 - "Is It You"
1981 - "Mr. Briefcase"
1982 - "No One There"
1986 - "Woman I Love"
1984 - "Round The Corner"
1987 - "Turn The Heat Up"
1989 - "We're At The Crossroads"
1997 - "Never Too Far"
2007 - "My Little Ones"
2010 - "Another Waste of Time"

Appears on

References

1953 births
Living people
American jazz singers
American soft rock musicians
Elektra Records artists
Jazz musicians from California
Jazz songwriters
Jazz-pop singers
People from Chicago
Smooth jazz singers
Jazz musicians from Illinois
American male jazz musicians
American male singer-songwriters
Singer-songwriters from California
Singer-songwriters from Illinois